The 1997 UCLA Bruins softball team represented the University of California, Los Angeles in the 1997 NCAA Division I softball season.  The Bruins were coached by Sue Enquist, in her ninth season as head coach.  The Bruins played their home games at Easton Stadium and finished with a record of 49–14.  They competed in the Pacific-10 Conference, where they finished second with a 21–7 record.

The Bruins were invited to the 1997 NCAA Division I softball tournament, where they swept the Regional and then completed a run to the title game of the Women's College World Series where they fell to champion Arizona.

Personnel

Roster

Coaches

Schedule

Ranking movements

References

UCLA
UCLA Bruins softball seasons
1997 in sports in California
Women's College World Series seasons